European Parliament elections were held in Croatia for the first time on 14 April 2013 to elect twelve Members of the European Parliament. The members served the remainder of the Parliament's 2009–2014 term after Croatia entered the European Union on 1 July 2013. The country formed a single constituency, with members elected by proportional representation using open lists.

Despite opinion polling predicting a decisive victory of the governing centre left SDP-led coalition, the centre right HDZ-led coalition won a razor-thin plurality of the vote. The turnout of just 20.8% was the lowest turnout in a national election in modern Croatian history.

Parties

Opinion polls

Results

Elected lists and candidates

See also
List of members of the European Parliament for Croatia, 2013–2014

References

European Parliament
Croatia
European Parliament elections in Croatia
April 2013 events in Europe